Seo Hye-lin (Hangul: 서혜린; born August 23, 1993), referred to as Hyelin, is a South Korean singer. She is best known as a member of the South Korean girl group EXID.

Career
In 2011, she participated in Mnet's Superstar K3, making it through the auditions to "SuperWeek".

In April 2012, AB Entertainment announced that the three original members Yuji, Dami and Na Hae-ryung would leave EXID. Hye-lin then joined the group along with Heo Sol-ji.

In April 2019, Hyelin opened her own YouTube channel ‘Jeul-Lin TV’ short for ‘Joy Full-Lin TV’.

On January 15, 2020, Hyelin terminated her contract with Banana Culture and left the agency.

On May 6, 2020, Hyelin signed an exclusive contract with SidusHQ.

On May 6, 2021, Hyelin made her solo debut with the digital single "Lonely".

Discography

Singles

Filmography

Television show

Ambassadorship 
 Public relations ambassador for Namyangju (2020–present)

References

External links

 

1993 births
Living people
EXID members
K-pop singers
South Korean female idols
South Korean women pop singers
South Korean dance musicians
South Korean television personalities
People from Gwangju
Dongduk Women's University alumni
Superstar K participants
Mandarin-language singers of South Korea
IHQ (company) artists